Greece competed at the 2009 Mediterranean Games in Pescara, Italy.

Medalists

Gold

 Gymnastics
Pommel Horse: Eleftherios Kosmidis
Balance beam: Vasiliki Millousi

 Athletics
100 metres: Georgia Kokloni 
Pole vault: Nikoleta Kyriakopoulou
Triple jump: Athanasia Perra
Javelin throw: Voisava Lika

 Rowing
Single sculls: Vasileios Polymeros
Lightweight Single Sculls: Giorgos Christou
Lightweight Single Sculls: Alexandra Tsiavou
LW2x: Christina Giazitzidou, Triantafyllia Kalampoka

 Table tennis
Men's Singles: Panagiotis Gionis

 Wrestling
Men's Greco-Roman 66 kg: Gievgkeni Pentorets

 Karate
Kumite −67 kg: Dimitrios Triantafyllis
Kumite −84 kg: Konstantinos Papadopoulos

 Judo
−90 kg: Ilias Iliadis
−57 kg: Ioulieta Boukouvala

References

External links
Official Website of the 2009 Mediterranean Games

Nations at the 2009 Mediterranean Games
2009
Mediterranean Games